Fahd Moufi (born 5 May 1996) is a professional footballer who plays as a right-back for Portimonense S.C. of the Portuguese Primeira Liga. Born in France, he represented Morocco at international youth levels.

Club career
Moufi moved from the academy of FC Mulhouse to Olympique Lyonnais in 2013, and signed his first professional contract with them on 17 February 2016. He spent a season on loan with CS Sedan Ardennes, before signing with C.D. Tondela on 17 July 2017. Moufi made his professional debut for Tondela in a 2–1 Primeira Liga loss to S.C. Braga on 24 September 2017, getting a red card in the 4th minute. On 30 September 2020, Moufi joined Portimonense S.C.

International career
Moufi represented the Morocco U17s at the 2013 African U-17 Championship. He represented the Morocco U20s at a youth tournament in China in 2015.

Moufi was called up to the Morocco U23 national team for a friendly in June 2016, but was kicked out of the team for getting caught smoking hookah with some teammates. He was re-called into the team, and made three appearances at the 2017 Islamic Solidarity Games for the Morocco U23s.

References

External links
 
 
 OLWeb Profile
 Liga Portugal Profile
 Mountakhab Profile 

Living people
1996 births
Footballers from Mulhouse
Moroccan footballers
Morocco youth international footballers
French footballers
French sportspeople of Moroccan descent
C.D. Tondela players
CS Sedan Ardennes players
Portimonense S.C. players
Primeira Liga players
Championnat National players
Association football defenders
Moroccan expatriate footballers
French expatriate footballers
Moroccan expatriate sportspeople in Portugal
French expatriate sportspeople in Portugal
Expatriate footballers in Portugal